Anastasia Dmytrivna Ziurkalova (born 23 October 1991) is a Ukrainian stage and film actress. She is best known for roles in the film  Aurora  (2006)  and TV series The Sniffer (2015).

Career
In the cinema, Anastasia happened to be by chance, having got to the casting of the film studio, where she was chosen by more than one hundred candidates. Prior to that, she had attended an art studio for several years, was engaged in swimming, photography and drawing, and studied foreign languages in depth. She studied at the Kyiv model studio. After her first film role, she firmly decided to become a professional actress. Director Oksana Bairak shot Nastya starring many of her films. The role of the girl from Pripyat in the film Aurora was written specifically for her.

Nastya's debut on the professional theatre stage took place in spring, 2014.

In 2016, Anastasia Ziurkalova graduated with honours from Kyiv Theatre University   (workshop of the Peoples Artist of Ukraine Mykola Rushkovskyi).

Anastasia Zyurkalova gives lessons in the Champion Kids children's club in the field of acting.

References

External links

1991 births 
Living people
Ukrainian child actresses
21st-century Ukrainian actresses
Ukrainian stage actresses
Ukrainian film actresses
Ukrainian television actresses
Kyiv National I. K. Karpenko-Kary Theatre, Cinema and Television University alumni
Actors from Kyiv